The 2019 Women's European Baseball Championship was an international baseball tournament for women organized by Confederation of European Baseball. The 2019 European Championship was held in July and August 2019 in Rouen, France. The winner qualified for 2020 Women's Baseball World Cup.

Teams 
The following three teams qualified for the 2019 championship.

Group stage

Final

Final Standings

References

External links
Official site

European Baseball Championship

2010s in women's baseball
2019 in baseball
International sports competitions hosted by France
Women's baseball competitions